Financial Core (also known as FiCore or Fi-Core) refers to a legal carve out that permits workers opposed to participating in a labor union to be employed under the benefits of a union's contracts without compelling them to be a member of that union.

The term "Financial Core" was first used in a 1963 United States Supreme Court decision, National Labor Relations Board v. General Motors. The court determined, while workers cannot be compelled to be a union "member" as a condition of employment, they would be compelled to pay their share of a union's collective bargaining activities. The court referred to these collective bargaining costs as a union's Financial Core.

The court's decision requiring all workers in a union facility or profession to pay toward collective bargaining costs stemmed from its determination that all workers employed in a union environment—even those opposed to being union members—benefit from the union's collective bargaining which improves wages, working conditions, safety, and protections.

While union members pay "dues" toward collective bargaining, workers who elect Financial Core status pay an equal amount the court referred to as "fees."

The worker who chooses Financial Core status is not a union member, cannot run or vote in union elections, and is legally referred to as a "Fee Paying Non Member" or an "Agency Fee Payer." On the job, they are often referred to as Financial Core workers, or Ficore workers. Union slang refers to Ficore workers as "scabs"  since they work outside the union's membership rules and refuse to stand with their coworkers in solidarity.

While the Financial Core ruling came out of General Motors's (GM) dispute with the United Auto Workers (UAW), this Supreme Court ruling applies to all unions in the United States.

Although GM sought to undermine the UAW, the court's ruling that collective bargaining led to better working conditions for all workers was a win for unions. The court's carve out for Financial Core status has had a limited effect on unions in most cases.

The exception is the entertainment unions with contracts in the film, television, and television commercial industry, which in some cases have been negatively affected. Ficore status allows fee paying non members to skirt entertainment union rules that require members only accept work under union contracts. Since Ficore are not bound by union regulations and rules, workers can accept work from nonunion employers outside union contracts which negatively affects the health and bargaining power of those unions.



Origin

The Supreme Court's 1963 Financial Core decision was one chapter in a series of ongoing corporate challenges to discount and even break Labor Unions since the 1930s rise of workers' rights in the Labor Movement.

Specifically, the case grew out of General Motors Corporation's (GM) refusal to recognize and negotiate with the United Auto Workers (UAW) in Indiana.

GM claimed it would not recognize the UAW since that union was violating labor law by compelling workers to join the UAW as a condition of employment with GM.

GM's argument followed several states including Indiana's emerging right-to-work laws which said workers could not be compelled to join a union and pay union dues. The motivation was seen by legal observers as a bid to limit and even eliminate unions and Collective Bargaining.

GM's bid to weaken the UAW was largely unsuccessful. Even with the court's Ficore carve out, as of December 2020 a mere .24% of workers affiliated with the UAW have elected FiCore status.

The fees paid by FiCore are equal to the amount a union member pays in initiation fees and ongoing dues, but in keeping with the anti-union stance of the Non Member the payments are called "agency fees" as opposed to "member dues." In subsequent years, ongoing challenges to unions before the Supreme Court resulted slight reductions to agency fees when compared to member dues in some cases. 

The Financial Core agency fees amount to the non-member's portion of the actual costs to staff and manage union operations including contract negotiations that protect workers interests and improve the working conditions.

FiCore surrender their union membership and card, cannot claim to be a union member, cannot run or vote for union office, cannot vote on contracts, and are not subject to any rules regulations set forth by the union.

Beck Rights, Fee Reduction for Union Political and Organizing Activities

Since the 1963 Supreme Court decision, corporations continue to work to weaken and eliminate unions and issues surrounding the Financial Core ruling continue to be litigated.

In 1988, the Supreme Court again addressed the financial core issue in Communications Workers of America v. Beck. The question this time was whether an employee who is Ficore and not a union member can be required to pay a fee equal to full union dues, if a portion of those fees are used for purposes beyond collective bargaining: contract negotiations, contract administration, grievance adjustment, and the like. The court ruled in a 5 to 3 decision, with Justice William Brennan writing for the majority, that the financial core obligation does not include "the obligation to support union activities beyond those germane to collective bargaining, contract administration, and grievance adjustment."

This adjustment related to the Financial Core ruling came out of a 1988 Supreme Court decision and are known as Beck Rights. This additional carve out to the Financial Core ruling determined workers can opt out of paying toward union spending on "non-representational" activities. In most unions a so-called "Beck Objector" is required to claim Financial Core status before that worker can benefit from the fee reduction offered by Beck Rights.

This Supreme Court Case grew out of a complaint by FiCore employee Harry E. Beck and who protested the Communication Workers of America's support of 1968 Democratic Presidential Candidate Hubert Humphrey. Beck and a few additional FiCore workers who joined him wanted refunds of the portion of their agency fees that went to supporting the Democrat, because Humphrey was a Gun Control supporter.

Beck Rights state the FiCore worker cannot be required to pay toward a union's support of non-representational activities such as contributions to political candidates, political agendas, political lobbying, and money spent on union organizing endeavors.

Since unions have decades of history supporting Democratic candidates and agendas, the 1988 decision has been seen as a slight win for often Republican-leaning corporate interests.

The discount in fees for these non-representational activities is minimal since unions generally only spend between 1%-4% of their budget for political activities and organizing. The savings for FiCore workers, therefore, is generally 1%-4% when compared to a union member paying full union dues.

More recently, agency fees have been litigated as "Fair Share Fees." With the exception of the above-mentioned Beck Rights, the fundamental rulings of the Supreme Court's 1963 decision remain the same.

Non Membership

The process to claim FiCore status requires the worker to first meet the threshold for joining a specific union, join that union paying all initiation fees, then legally notifying that union they will be withdrawing and surrendering their union card in favor of electing Financial Core Status.

Since FiCore workers have chosen to quit the union and undermine the strength of solidarity at the bargaining table, union workers often use negative slang terms to refer to FiCore. The most common slang term for FiCore historically is "scab." FiCore workers are generally seen by union members as siding with management and corporate interests instead of supporting the employees they work beside and the union that represents and protects them.

Controversy continues as to the definition of financial core, the impact it has in the workplace.

Under the National Labor Relations Act (Sec. 8 (a) (3)) an employer and a labor organization may agree to condition employment upon membership in the union. The 1963 ruling limited the burdens of membership upon which employment may be conditioned to the payment of initiation fees and monthly dues. In the words of the court, "Membership as a condition of employment is whittled down to its financial core." Or, in other words, "If an employee in a union shop unit refuses to respect any union-imposed obligations other than the duty to pay dues and fees, and membership in the union is therefore denied or terminated, the condition of membership for 8 (a) (3) purposes is nevertheless satisfied and the employee may not be discharged for nonmembership even though he is not a formal member."

Impact

In every union the percentage of workers who elect Financial Core status is minimal.

The workers who do elect FiCore status cannot run for union elected office, cannot vote in union elections, cannot claim to be union members, and are not entitled to union perks that vary depending on the industry. FiCore are entitled to the same wages and benefits as union workers in a union workplace. Finally, the FiCore worker cannot be held accountable to any union guidelines, rules, and regulations since they are no longer union members. Being a worker who operates outside union rules has greater impact in some industries than in others.

Entertainment Industry Unions and Financial Core

A unique impact of the FiCore ruling can be seen in the entertainment industry unions including the American Professional Actors' Union, SAG-AFTRA, Professional Writers' Union  Writers Guild of America (WGA), and the professional Film Directors Union  Directors Guild of America (DGA).  The entertainment industry has been primarily composed of unionized Gig Workers for decades. An unintended side effect of the Supreme Court's Financial Core ruling emerged in this unique freelance environment which benefits corporations and those who work toward breaking entertainment unions.

While union workers in most industries generally work for one employer—sometimes in one location for years at a time—workers in the entertainment industry freelance and might work for dozens or more employers in an average year navigating job to job in film, television, and television commercials.

The strength and bargaining leverage of unions in the entertainment industry stems from all union members' allegiance to their union and refusal to accept work in nonunion productions.

Entertainment union workers, aware of the benefits collective bargaining affords them, pledge to only accept work from employers who agree to work under the provisions of the collectively bargained union contracts. This pledge essentially creates a virtual strike line around employers not willing to recognize the jurisdiction of one of the entertainment union.

SAG-AFTRA members, for example, agree to adhere to Global Rule One which states, "No member shall render any services or make an agreement to perform services for any employer who has not executed a basic minimum agreement with the union, which is in full force and effect, in any jurisdiction in which there is a SAG-AFTRA national collective bargaining agreement in place. This provision applies worldwide."  Simply put, a SAG-AFTRA member must always work under a union contract around the globe.

The FiCore, or "scab" as loyal union members refer to them, makes a choice to no longer honor the pledge they made when they became a union member.

The strength of solidarity is undermined when a Ficore crosses a virtual strike line allowing employers to pay less and skirt union protections and benefits.

Instead, FiCore sides with anti-union productions diluting the strength of the unions and aiding in the growth of nonunion work. Even though FiCore are actively union busting they cannot be blocked from working on union projects that benefit from the majority of professionals holding the union line.

There are occasions when an entertainment union worker accepts work in a nonunion project. This is against union regulation and known as working "off the card." Unions can and do take disciplinary action on the occasion member is reported or otherwise found to be working off the card.

However workers who have claimed FiCore status have disavowed the union and any union rules or regulations. Since the FiCore does not operate under the jurisdiction of the union they are not subject to any union disciplinary action for working nonunion jobs. Further, the FiCore cannot be prohibited from accepting work in union productions even though they are actively undermining the gains the union contract provides.

In Hollywood and other film, TV, and TV commercial hubs, union busting production companies, ad agencies, and brands launch an offensive on the unions by trying to lure individual members away from union protections to work on non union jobs. FiCore workers can participate in this union busting per the Supreme Court Decision.

Despite the heavy union busting push by some production companies and brands an extremely small percentage of talent guild members choose to leave their unions to claim FiCore status. The most recent numbers available show performers affiliated with SAG-AFTRA (4/30/2021) who choose FiCore status is 1.6%, Directors affiliated with the DGA (12/31/2020) who choose FiCore status is 1.29%  and Writers affiliated with the WGA East (3/31/2021) is 0.2%  and WGA West (3/31/2021) is 0.15%.

SAG-AFTRA and Financial Core

In recent years some ad agencies and brands that produce TV commercials have launched an assault on the professional performers union, SAG-AFTRA, in an effort to pay far less than union contracts provide.
 
Professional Talent Agents representing performers in commercials in Los Angeles claim SAG-AFTRA has lost ground in what was a 90% union foothold in 1999 to a mere 50% and possibly only 30% of commercials produced under union contracts in 2020. Those numbers are estimates since SAG-AFTRA does not publicly release commercial production figures and nonunion production figures are not compiled.

The efforts by Advertisers and Ad Agencies to produce nonunion commercials grows from a desire to cut costs by paying performers less than union minimums. SAG-AFTRA commercials contract sets minimum day rates, reuse rates, and provides protections, and benefits through mutual bargaining with the Joint Policy Committee (JPC). The JPC represents advertisers and ad agencies, collectively bargaining on their behalf with SAG-AFTRA.

Nonunion commercial productions are produced outside the JPC's agreements with SAG-AFTRA. Nonunion shoots are largely unregulated and compensation for performers in some platforms pay nothing, instead offering the performer "exposure." Nonunion commercials may also pay a one-time buyout to performers waiving their Personality Rights. Personality Rights provide a person control over commercial use of their identity, name, likeness, and image. They are the foundation of SAG-AFTRA contracts providing reuse payments when performer's image and work are reused.

A small percentage of SAG-AFTRA performers, generally motivated by reduced work opportunities for themselves competing with other union actors, facilitate ad agencies' and brands' union busting by offering to perform in nonunion TV commercials at much lower rates, and without residuals, benefits and protections provided by union contracts.

To sidle up with the union busting ad agencies and brands, these once-SAG-AFTRA performers claim FiCore status—not because they are philosophically opposed to unions—but to evade SAG-AFTRA regulations and disavow their agreement to stand by "Global Rule One."

Global Rule One is a simple agreement among union professional performers that each will hold the union line protecting both themselves, and possibly more importantly, their greater community of union performers. Since performers work in a gig economy often for many different union employers, withholding labor from nonunion employers prevents those nonunion employers from undermining union contracts. The virtual strike line of Global Rule One has proved to be substantial line protecting union members.

While the percentage of SAG-AFTRA performers who choose to quit the union for FiCore status is slight, even a small pool of professional performers offering their services to advertisers at rates often far below union minimums is a mounting threat to the union's ability to maintain a strong foothold in negotiations at the Collective Bargaining table.

As in any strike, workers who cross this de facto strike line are referred to as "union busters" or "scabs."  

The history of Labor Union grew out of the strength of solidarity of members willing to withhold labor in a strike action to achieve their employers' recognition of their union. Once recognized, withholding labor can again be used to force employers to bargain fairly in areas including wages, safe working conditions.

The reason strikes work is withholding labor effects the profits of business owners operating under unfair labor practices from the strikers' point of view.

In educating its members, the UAW shares, "Strikes are powerful for a simple reason: The only thing the boss wants from workers is labor. Withhold that, and the business grinds to a halt."

When performers join SAG-AFTRA they take a pledge to uphold Global Rule One which affirms they will not perform in any nonunion projects within the union's jurisdiction. Solidarity and accepting Global Rule One—professional performers' pledge to withhold labor from unfair employers—is the foundation that ensures the performer ability to hold on to gains achieved and retain a seat at the collective bargaining table with their employers.

Not all performers are on board with doing their part to support their SAG-AFTRA community, its members, its gains and its collective bargaining power.

Performers wishing to scab on nonunion project can legally claim FiCore status and avoid any union ramifications for their union busting behavior. This legal option allows performers to circumvent any SAG-AFTRA obligations, rules, guidelines, and discipline including union actors' pledge to refuse to work nonunion jobs. Refusing to hold the union line, FiCore performers facilitate the ongoing goal of these ad agencies and brands to pay performers less by coercing performers in TV commercials to cross the union line and work outside of SAG-AFTRA's jurisdiction.

The nonunion commercial route comes with downsides for most performers. Virtually every nonunion TV commercials offers a much lower one-time payment rather than fair ongoing income for as long as the spot runs in a union commercial.

Another drawback of Ficore nonunion commercials is extensive use of the performers image—sometimes use in perpetuity—with no further compensation to the performer.

Every state recognizes Personality Rights, which regard a person's name, likeness and image as their property. As such, SAG-AFTRA contracts require ongoing payments whenever a performers image—their property—airs in a TV spot. The payment schedule, known as residuals, is spelled out in the union contract where performs are paid per use or for blocks of use of their image and performance.

Ficore working in nonunion commercials do not receive residuals, instead signing away their personality rights for one payday.

Because of their participation in undermining SAG-AFTRA's gains, FiCore often face the ire of loyal union members who consider FiCore actors union busters and scabs.

Since classically ad agencies have hired talent through talent agencies, union busting alliances needed to be set up between ad agencies, talent agencies, and professional actors willing to union bust for less compensation.

Since the professional performers union was founded in the 1930s this kind of alliance promoting nonunion work wasn't feasible since the actors' union (at that time, Screen Actors Guild) had a collectively bargained franchise agreement with the Association of Talent Agents (ATA) who representeded most union performers. The franchise agreement, known as "Rule 16(g)," prohibited agents from taking commissions in excess of 10% and strictly regulated talent agents' fiduciary duties to their union clients.

In 2002, however, negotiations between SAG and the ATA broke down and the Rule 16(g) contract between the two expired. Without union regulations, talent agents have been able keep more of the money paid toward the actors' performance via much higher nonunion commissions and nonunion fees talent agents collect. The larger nonunion commissions and fees incentivized them to grow deportments representing Ficore actors. Although the actor earns much less, talent agents generally take 40% of the money budgeted for the actors' performance.

Offering FiCore actors to ad agencies and brands for much lower wages than performers working union contracts wasn't possible under Rule 16(g). SAG, and later SAG-AFTRA's, failure to continue the franchise agreement Rule 16(g) with talent agents allows agents to abandon the best interest of their union roster by offering nonunion performers at cheaper rates.

Even with Rule 16(g) expired, talent agents are not permitted to take more than 10% commissions from SAG-AFTRA performers due to provisions in the standard union contract. But where a performer is FiCore and not represented by the union, talent agents were free to collect 20% commissions, the maximum allowed by California Labor Law. In addition to the 20% commission, the ad agency or brand funnel 20% of the money budgeted for the actor's performance to talent agent labeling it a "fee."

The cost produce TV commercials and the common format of a 15, 30, or 60 second TV spot generally requires casting of a skilled, professional performer capable of precision timing. Performers in commercials need to tell an entire story within the short format with meticulous execution of dialogue and precise telegraphing of emotion.

Without the constraints of Rule 16(g) talent agents had new freedom to represent talent at lower nonunion wages, but the seasoned professional performers who could handle the task of commercial acting were mostly union members.

To offer seasoned professional actors at nonunion rates, some Talent Agents' moved to exploit the FiCore carve out encouraging union talent to renounce union membership in favor of FiCore status.

This allowed talent agents a new found freedom to undercut their union clients. Some of the top talent agencies representing top commercial talent began to either accept or encourage their SAG-AFTRA clients to enlist FiCore status fostering a growth in nonunion TV commercials.

Since talent agents work for commissions which are a percentage of the performers' earnings, the plan to submit their roster to lower paying jobs might seem ill-conceived. But talent agents working in the nonunion arena do not honor the SAG-AFTRA maximum commission of 10% instead doubling to the California state maximum allowable 20%, adding an additional 20% in fees.

Since the ad agencies were saving money using FiCore talent they developed the pay structure that breaks up the gross amount budgeted to hire the FiCore nonunion performer. In nonunion spots, ad agencies classically divert part of the money budgeted for talent as an upfront 20% "fee" to talent agents. The upfront fee is often referred to as an agent's "+20% Fee" in casting notices. In this pay structure the ad agency pays the talent agent the +20% fee upfront and the talent agent collects another 20% commission from the actor's paycheck.

These two 20% payments are known in the industry as "double-dipping." In nonunion TV commercials talent agents' double-dipping allows a 40% take when compared to the money paid to a performer. Double dipping in California is illegal and performers who are victims of this scam have received restitution and penalties filing claims with the California Department of Industrial Relations.

While the income from the nonunion commercials is nominal at best, some FiCore performers leverage their underpaid performance to sell their own TV commercial workshops and classes to newcomers using some form of "you've seen me on TV" as a marketing tool.

But more established actors tend to hold the union for fair wages and union protections. Some are outspoken about the benefits of union work including actor Jon Hamm, who himself works in union commercials and recently reached out a message of solidarity, saying, "We will stand up and fight for a living wage for our union sisters and brothers working the commercial contract."

Because nonunion spots offer less money, talent agents generally double the commission they collect from the actor's paycheck. SAG-AFTRA limits agent commissions to 10% and prohibits talent agents from charging addition fees.

The compensation breakdown in nonunion work in California also heavily favors the agent's wallet leaving little income for the actor. In most cases the advertiser offers agents a 20% fee upfront. Following that 20% up-front fee the performer pays another 20% from their paycheck. Known in the industry as "double-dipping," the amount budgeted by the advertiser for a specific performer is split in a way that gives the agent 40% of the gross.

Some nonunion performers have pushed back against double dipping talent agents filing charges with the California Department of Industrial Relations where the 40% commission has been found to be a violation of California Labor Code. Since Labor Code limits agent commissions to 20%, some actors filing charges have received restitution and monetary penalties from offending talent agents.  In the nonunion arena, however, FiCore performers don't have access to the union's contract enforcement or the union's legal team meaning all attorney costs and legal fees are their own responsibility. Whatever the reason, few FiCore and nonunion actors protest the often illegal 40% commissions.

With these downsides for performers, most professional performers stick with the union for fair wages, benefits, and protections that go with it. In fact, as of 2020 only 1.56% of performers affiliated with SAG-AFTRA elected FiCore status.

In recent years, SAG-AFTRA has stepped up its educational campaign to share the upside of union work and the pitfalls of working in commercials without union protections. Part of the educational outreach was the launch of the Ads Go Union campaign that visits improv comedy houses and nonunion commercial sets.

A grassroots group of SAG-AFTRA performers calling themselves Union Working—many members recognizable from memorable union TV campaigns—banded together to educate performers on the drawbacks of FiCore nonunion ads. Union Working has produced videos highlighting the advantages and importance of union work and the downside of FiCore. The videos have included some high-profile SAG-AFTRA members. Some of the pro union videos include proud SAG-AFTRA members; Jon Hamm, Allison Janney, J.K. Simmons, Eric Stonestreet, George Lopez,
Marion Ross, Nick Offerman, Mindy Sterling, Zoey Deutch, Mayim Bialik, Dermot Mulroney, and more.

WGA and Financial Core

The Writers Guild of America takes an aggressive stance against writers who choose Financial Core status to help corporations in their effort to weaken the WGA.

At one time, then-WGA West president Patric Verrone and his then-WGA East counterpart, Michael Winship, put out a joint statement naming members who chose to break solidarity by claiming Financial Core status as writers "who consciously and selfishly decided to place their own narrow interests over the greater good.”

References

External links
 Global Rule One: SAG-AFTRA
 Answers and Questions About Financial Core
 Double Dipping Lawsuit: Court Requires Agent to Refund Illegal 40% Commissions
 Writers Guild of America, West Non-Member "Financial Core Status" Policy Statement
 How SAG's Failed Negotiations with Talent Agents Left Rank & File on the Cutting Room Floor

United States federal labor legislation